Oka Tokat (stylized as Oka2Kat) is a Philippine paranormal, supernatural drama, horror fiction series which aired on ABS-CBN from February 4 to May 5, 2012. It is a stand-alone sequel to the 1997 television series !Oka Tokat. A full trailer was launched during Budoy.

Overview

Synopsis 
It focuses on five teens who need to retrieve stolen cursed objects and save the whole town from its near destruction at the hands of an unseen evil. Andrew (Paul Salas), a young bullied city boy, wants to have a complete family. When his parents got separated, he lives with his call center-agent mother Alice (Dimples Romana). Right after being bullied again, Andrew is enjoined by his mother to temporarily live in Pueblo Peligro with his grandfather Inong (Nanding Josef), who unbeknownst to them, secures cursed objects in a secret chamber in their family-owned local museum. As Andrew adjusts in his new world, he rediscovers his family roots, meets his "crush" and finds himself drawn to the cursed objects, which on one fateful night, are stolen leading to the death of his grandfather. With the help of his newfound friends Neil (Makisig Morales), Luna (Sue Anna Ramirez), Princess (Jane Oineza), and Joey (Joshua Colet), Andrew embarks on a quest to redeem the damned antiques and consequently give justice to his grandfather's death.
But as Andrew and his friends reclaim those doomed objects, they are inevitably enmeshed in a life-altering, horrific and fun adventure, filled with seemingly insurmountable obstacles and schemes by an unknown force of evil that will put their friendship to the ultimate test.

Episodes

Cast and characters

Main cast
 Paul Salas as Andrew - "The Cool Guy". In his quest to feel love and acceptance, Andrew, who is technically skilled with computers, leads the group in search of the stolen cursed objects. He is the 13th relic.
 Makisig Morales as  Neil - "The Nerd". Bookish and brainy, Neil finds comfort in acquiring tons of knowledge but aims to experience a more fun and adventurous life beyond books.
 Sue Ramirez as Luna - "The Clairvoyant". Haunted by her ability of foresight, Luna strives to accept and hone her talent while struggling to belong in the community.
 Jane Oineza as Princess - "The Queenbee". Rich, spoiled and popular, Princess aids the group financially. She secretly seeks to be appreciated by many.
 Joshua Colet as Joey - "The Brawn". In spite of the challenges of poverty, Joey utilizes his physical and inner strength to overcome the hand he's dealt with.

Supporting cast
 Dimples Romana as Alice
 Nanding Josef as Inong
 Janus Del Prado as Harold
 DJ Durano as Mayor Alfonso
 Kalila Aguilos as Miranda
 Perla Bautista as Aring
 RJ Calipus as Tisoy

Guest cast
 Lauren Young as Celestina
 Bettina Carlos as Choleng
 Johan Santos as Young Inong
 Kristel Moreno as Michelle
 Miles Ocampo as Dolores
 Celine Lim as Violet
 Nick Lizaso as Lauro
 Dino Imperial as Young Lauro
 Tanya Gomez as Midea
 Justin Cuyugan as Andrew's Father
 Princess Mazon as Girlfriend of Andrew's Father
 Mikylla Ramirez as Bully Girl
 Mark Joshua Sarayot as Bully Boy 1
 Alfred Labatos as Bully Boy 2
 Hermes Bautista as Pawid
 Mark Luz as Iman
 Martin del Rosario as Punong Aba
 Yen Santos as Kimana
 John Manalo as Young Alfonso
 Trina Legaspi as Young Alice
 Kristel Fulgar as Young Miranda

See also
List of programs aired by ABS-CBN
List of ABS-CBN drama series

References

External links
 

Philippine horror fiction television series
ABS-CBN drama series
Serial drama television series
2012 Philippine television series debuts
2012 Philippine television series endings
Filipino-language television shows
Television series reboots
Television shows set in the Philippines